Dothiorella moneti is an endophytic fungus that might be a canker pathogen, specifically for Eucalyptus gomphocephala. It was isolated from said trees in Western Australia.

References

Further reading
Pavlic-Zupanc, D., et al. "Molecular and morphological characterization of Dothiorella species associated with dieback of Ostrya carpinifolia in Slovenia and Italy, and a host and geographic range extension for D. parva."
Urbez-Torres, Jose Ramon, et al. "Characterization of fungal pathogens associated with grapevine trunk diseases in Arkansas and Missouri." Fungal diversity 52.1 (2012): 169–189.
Pitt, Wayne M., José Ramón Úrbez-Torres, and Florent P. Trouillas. "Dothiorella and Spencermartinsia, new species and records from grapevines in Australia." Australasian Plant Pathology 44.1 (2015): 43–56.

External links
MycoBank

moneti
Fungi described in 2009